Marc Hertz is an American soap opera writer.

Positions held
The Young and the Restless
Script Writer (October 16, 2003 - May 10, 2006)

Awards and nominations
Daytime Emmy Awards
WIN: 2006; Best Writing; Y&R
NOMINATIONS: 2005 & 2006; Best Writing; Y&R
Writers Guild of America Award 
WIN: 2005 season; Y&R

References

American soap opera writers
American male television writers
Living people
Year of birth missing (living people)